Sir George Augustus William Shuckburgh-Evelyn, 6th Baronet (23 August 1751 – 11 August 1804) was a British politician, mathematician and astronomer.

Life
George Shuckburgh was born on 23 August 1751, the son of Richard Shuckburgh of Limerick. He was educated at Rugby School and Balliol College, Oxford, from which he earned a bachelor's degree in 1772.

He became a baronet in 1773, on the death of his uncle, and (after returning from his postgraduate travels to Europe) moved to Shuckburgh Hall, the family estate in Shuckburgh, Warwickshire.

In 1774, Shuckburgh was elected a Fellow of the Royal Society.

He served in the House of Commons as a Member of Parliament for Warwickshire from 1780 until his death in 1804.

In 1782, he was married to Sarah Johanna Darker, daughter of John Darker. His second marriage on 6 October 1785 was to Julia Annabella Evelyn, the daughter of James Evelyn of Felbridge; when his father-in-law died in 1793, Shuckburgh added Evelyn to his own surname. Their daughter, Julia Evelyn Medley Shuckburgh, married Charles Jenkinson, 3rd Earl of Liverpool.

Shuckburgh died on 11 August 1804 in Lower Shuckburgh, Warwickshire.

Scientific contributions

He made a series of astronomical observations and an ephemeris, which he published in twelve volumes between 1774 and 1797. In 1791 the Shuckburgh telescope was installed at his private observatory in Warwickshire, England.
Included among his observations were measurements of lunar surface features. The crater Shuckburgh on the Moon is named after him.

Shuckburgh also contributed to metrology. He performed a series of observations on the change in the boiling point of water at different pressures, and pointed out the need for controlling for this effect when calibrating thermometers. The Shuckburgh scale was a standard brass yard constructed for him by Edward Troughton, whose company later made the Victorian standard yard of 1855; the Shuckburgh scale was used by George Biddell Airy in his measurements of the earth's shape, and in setting standards for many years by the British government.

In statistics, Shuckburgh was a pioneer in the collation of price indexes.

He became a Fellow of the Royal Society in 1774. In 1798, he was co-winner of the Copley Medal, the highest award of the Society.

References

External links

1751 births
1804 deaths
People from Warwickshire
People educated at Rugby School
Alumni of Balliol College, Oxford
Baronets in the Baronetage of England
18th-century British astronomers
18th-century English mathematicians
Recipients of the Copley Medal
Members of the Parliament of Great Britain for English constituencies
British MPs 1780–1784
British MPs 1784–1790
British MPs 1790–1796
British MPs 1796–1800
Members of the Parliament of the United Kingdom for English constituencies
UK MPs 1801–1802
UK MPs 1802–1806
Fellows of the Royal Society